SubtleTea is a Pittsburgh-based online journal.  It includes artist interviews, poetry, prose, visual art, links and resources. Founded by its editor David Herrle in 2002, the site has participants from California, South Africa, New York, India, Georgia and Ireland. 

A new edition goes online every four months.

References

External links
 SubtleTea website

2002 establishments in Pennsylvania
Visual arts magazines published in the United States
Online magazines published in the United States
Quarterly magazines published in the United States
Magazines established in 2002
Magazines published in Pittsburgh